Anthony James Henry Kirkhope (born 10 October 1949) was a British filmmaker and distributor. He was also the co-founder of the Latin American Film Festival.

Biography

Film
As well as producing and directing films, he founded the Metro cinema in Rupert Street and also the Latin American Film Festival. 
He is credited to have produced a short video piece called Soft and Hard.

Personal life
Tony married Eva Tarr who was born in Havana, Cuba. She is a graduate of History of Art and English. She worked for the Women's Film, Television and Video Network (WFTVN) sponsored by the Greater London Council and Channel Four. She was later head of development of Icarus Film, then co-owner and director of Metro Tartan Ltd, and director of Metro Pictures and Metro Cinemas. She and Tony founded the Latin American Film Festival in 1990.

He is related to Scottish filmmaker Stewart Hannah.

Death

He died in his sleep age 47 in 1997.

External links
BBC Film - London's Feast for Latin Film
Latin American Film Festival
The Sunday Times - Cuban reels
LAFF @ Film Festival World

British film directors
British film producers
1950 births
1997 deaths